Anastasios "Tasos" Bountouris (born 2 August 1955 in Piraeus, Greece) is a Greek sailor who competed at six Olympics between 1976 and 1996. He is the first Greek to compete at six Olympic Games, an achievement so far matched only by shooter Agathi Kassoumi.

He won a bronze medal in the 1980 Olympics in the Soling with Anastasios Gavrilis and Aristidis Rapanakis.

His brother Antonios is also a sailor; they were part of the same Soling team at the 1988 Olympics.

See also
 List of athletes with the most appearances at Olympic Games

References

1955 births
Living people
Olympic bronze medalists for Greece
Olympic sailors of Greece
Greek male sailors (sport)
Sailors at the 1976 Summer Olympics – Finn
Sailors at the 1980 Summer Olympics – Soling
Sailors at the 1984 Summer Olympics – Soling
Sailors at the 1988 Summer Olympics – Soling
Sailors at the 1992 Summer Olympics – Soling
Sailors at the 1996 Summer Olympics – Star
Sailors (sport) from Piraeus
Soling class world champions
Medalists at the 1980 Summer Olympics
Olympic medalists in sailing